Kathleen Ann Chalfant (née Bishop; born January 14, 1945) is an American actress. She has appeared in many stage plays, both on Broadway and Off-Broadway, as well as making guest appearances on television series, including the Law & Order franchise.

Life and career
Chalfant was born Kathleen Ann Bishop in San Francisco, California, and was raised in her parents' boarding house in Oakland. Her father, William Bishop, was an officer in the Coast Guard. She studied acting in New York with Wynn Handman, who was a protégé of Sanford Meisner, and with Alessandro Fersen in Rome.

Chalfant worked as a Production Coordinator at Playwrights Horizons in the mid-1970s, beginning with Demons: A Possession by Robert Karmon. She made her Off-Broadway acting debut in Cowboy Pictures in June 1974. She has since appeared in over three dozen Off-Broadway productions. In 2015, she appeared in the Women's Project Theater production of Dear Elizabeth by Sarah Ruhl and as Rose Kennedy in the Nora's Playhouse production of Rose by Laurence Leamer.

Chalfant was nominated for her official Broadway debut role at the 1993 Tony Awards for Best Actress (Featured Role - Play) in Tony Kushner's Angels in America: Millennium Approaches. She earned the Outer Circle Critics, Drama Desk, Obie and Lucille Lortel awards for her performance as Vivian Bearing in Margaret Edson's Pulitzer Prize-winning play Wit in 1998; she shaved her head for the role. During her work with Wit, she incorporated her experiences dealing with terminal cancer of her half-brother, Alan Palmer, who died in 1998.

For her 2003 performance in Alan Bennett's Talking Heads, Chalfant won a second Obie award. In 2009, Chalfant performed in The People Speak, a documentary feature film utilizing dramatic and musical performances of the letters, diaries, and speeches of everyday Americans, based on historian Howard Zinn's A People's History of the United States.

Chalfant has played recurring roles in a number of television series including House of Cards, Law & Order, Rescue Me, and The Guardian. Her roles in feature films have included Isn't It Delicious and Kinsey.

Chalfant recently played Margaret Butler in The Affair on Showtime.

She was presented with the 2018 Obie Award for Lifetime Achievement.

In 2018, Chalfant read T. S. Eliot's Four Quartets at the Bard SummerScape Festival as part of a new performance with choreography by Pam Tanowitz, music by Kaija Saariaho, and images by Brice Marden.

Personal life
In 1966, Chalfant married Henry Chalfant, a photographer and documentary filmmaker. They have a son, David Chalfant, who was the bass player for the folk-rock band The Nields, and a daughter, Andromache, a set designer in New York.

Social justice and political activism
Chalfant has spoken about the role of art and artists in advocating for civil rights and social justice, and "theater as a platform for social change." She has been hosted by the Center for Constitutional Rights as part of the Guantanamo Lawyers Panel, and was among a group of artists endorsing a cultural boycott of Israel as part of the Boycott, Divestment and Sanctions (BDS) campaign to advocate for Palestinian rights.

Filmography

Film

Television

Theatre

Awards and nominations

References

External links
 
 
 

1945 births
American film actresses
American television actresses
Drama Desk Award winners
Living people
Obie Award recipients
Actresses from Oakland, California
20th-century American actresses
21st-century American actresses
American stage actresses
Actresses from San Francisco